Vitaliy Gankin is a Russian sprint canoer who competed in the late 1990s. He won three medals at the ICF Canoe Sprint World Championships with a silver (K-4 500 m: 1999) and two bronzes (K-4 200 m: 1999, K-4 500 m: 1998).

References 

Living people
Russian male canoeists
Year of birth missing (living people)
ICF Canoe Sprint World Championships medalists in kayak